Petrophile antecedens is a species of flowering plant in the family Proteaceae and is endemic to southwestern Western Australia. It is a small, erect, open shrub with sharply-pointed, cylindrical leaves and spherical heads of hairy, pale cream-coloured flowers.

Description
The flowers are arranged in sessile, spherical heads  in diameter, with many narrow egg-shaped, densely hairy involucral bracts at the base.

Taxonomy
Petrophile antecedens was first formally described in 2002 by Michael Clyde Hislop and Barbara Lynette Rye in the journal Nuytsia from material collected by Fred Hort near Wandering in 2000. The specific epithet (antecedens) means "preceding", referring to the flowering of this species before that of almost all other petrophiles.

Distribution and habitat
This petrophile mainly grows in eucalypt woodland, sometimes dense heath, and occurs in an area between Canning Dam, York, Darkan and Harrismith in the Avon Wheatbelt and Jarrah Forest biogeographic regions in the southwest of Western Australia.

Conservation status
Petrophile antecedens is classified as "not threatened" by the Western Australian Government Department of Parks and Wildlife.

References

antecedens
Eudicots of Western Australia
Endemic flora of Western Australia
Plants described in 2002
Taxa named by Barbara Lynette Rye